Leon Felton (born ) is a Rhodesian/Australian former professional rugby league footballer who played in the 2000s.

References

External links
Statistics at wolvesplayers.thisiswarrington.co.uk
Profile at saints.org.uk
Woodsy on… Warrington Wolves

1979 births
Living people
Leigh Leopards players
Place of birth missing (living people)
Rugby league centres
Rugby league fullbacks
Rugby league wingers
St Helens R.F.C. players
Warrington Wolves players
Zimbabwean rugby league players